Joseph Fafard  (September 2, 1942 – March 16, 2019) was a Canadian sculptor.

Biography
Joseph Fafard was a twelfth generation Canadian born in 1942 in Ste. Marthe, Saskatchewan, to French Canadians Leopold Fafard and Julienne Cantin. Fafard is a descendant of Jacques Goulet. He received a B.F.A from the University of Manitoba in 1966 and a M.F.A. from Pennsylvania State University in 1968. From 1968 to 1974, he taught sculpture at the University of Saskatchewan, Regina Campus (now the University of Regina).
He was a visiting lecturer at the University of California, Davis in 1980–1981. He received several awards throughout his professional career including being named an Officer of the Order of Canada in 1981, the Architectural Institute of Canada Allied Arts Award in 1987, the Saskatchewan Order of Merit in 2002, the National Prix Montfort in 2003, and the Lieutenant Governor's Saskatchewan Centennial Medal for the Arts in 2005. He also received Honorary Doctorate Degrees from the University of Regina (1989) and University of Manitoba (2007).

Fafard met Ric Gomez and David Gilhooly in 1968 when he arrived at the Regina School of Art to teach pottery and sculpture. They introduced him to Funk art and under their influence, he began making figures in clay. Throughout his career, Fafard sculpted with plaster, clay, and bronze, which was his primary medium in the 1980s. His work was heavily influenced by his Saskatchewan surroundings, and ranged in size from handheld to larger than life-sized. In 1985, he opened the Julienne Atelier foundry in Pense, Saskatchewan, where he was based for the majority of his working years. At the foundry, he worked in series, producing portraits of well-known artists and politicians, including bronzes of Canadian prime ministers Pierre Elliott Trudeau, and John G. Diefenbaker.

Fafard's works have been shown in Canada and abroad in countries including the United States, Great Britain, France and Japan. In 2007, Terrence Heath curated the retrospective exhibition Joe Fafard for the National Gallery of Canada and MacKenzie Art Gallery in Regina. His art was featured on a series of postage stamps issued by Canada Post in 2012.
The National Gallery of Canada in Ottawa installed his colourful Running Horses (2007) in 2011 adjacent to the Sussex Drive entrance.
 He died at his home outside of Lumsden, Saskatchewan on March 16, 2019, from stomach cancer at the age of 76.

Personal life
In 1967, Joe married Susan Wiebe, a major in ceramics also at the Winnipeg School of Art. [Source:  “Joe Fafard”, Terrence Heath, Vancouver: Douglas & McIntyre, 2007, p. 46] Their son, Joёl, was born on November 18, 1968.  Their first daughter, Misha, was born on March 23, 1970; and a second daughter, Gina, was born on December 10, 1972.  “By the end of the 1980s Joe and Susan’s marriage had become strained.  They began to live more and more separate lives.” [op cit, p. 162] Fafard divorced Susan in 1991.  During this period of professional and personal turmoil in Fafard’s life, he met Alyce Hamon, who came from a large French-Canadian family in Gravelbourg, Saskatchewan, who worked in French theatre in Saskatoon. [op cit, p. 166]  Joe’s third daughter, Solenne, was born to Alyce Hamon on May 29, 1994.  Joe’s second son, Julien, was born to Alyce on June 11, 1998.  Alyce Hamon and Joe were married on August 6, 2000. [op cit, p. 208-9]

Public works

 Oskana-Ka-Ashteki (Cree for Bones that are piled together), 800 block of Scarth Street in downtown Regina, Saskatchewan (1998)
 Claudia, along avenue de Musée entrance of Michal and Renata Hornstein Pavilion, Montreal Museum of Fine Arts (2003)

Awards
 Officer of the Order of Canada, 1981
 Medal in Allied Arts, Royal Architectural Institute of Canada, 1987
 Honorary Doctorate Degree, University of Regina, 1989 
 Saskatchewan Order of Merit, 2002
 National Prix Montfort, 2003
 Lieutenant Governor's Saskatchewan Centennial Medal for the Arts, 2005
 CTV Citizen of the Year in 2006 
 Honorary Doctorate Degree, University of Manitoba, 2007 
 Saskatchewan Arts Board Lifetime Achievement Award, 2007

References

Bibliography

External links

 Official site
 Joe Fafard at  JVGallery.ca
 I Don't Have to Work that Big, an NFB documentary
 Canada Post - Joe Fafard
 University of Regina Archives and Special Collections.  Joe Fafard Fonds.  https://www.uregina.ca/library/services/archives/collections/art-architecture/fafard.html
 University of Regina Archives and Special Collections.  Joe Fafard Slides.  http://cdm16438.contentdm.oclc.org/cdm/landingpage/collection/p15390coll1

1942 births
2019 deaths
20th-century Canadian sculptors
Canadian male sculptors
20th-century Canadian male artists
21st-century sculptors
Members of the Saskatchewan Order of Merit
Officers of the Order of Canada
Artists from Saskatchewan
Canadian Métis people
Deaths from stomach cancer
Métis sculptors
Deaths from cancer in Saskatchewan